The Man from Nowhere (French: L'Homme de nulle part) is a 1937 French drama film directed by Pierre Chenal and starring Pierre Blanchar, Isa Miranda and Catherine Fonteney. It was made at the Cines Studios in Rome, and based on Luigi Pirandello's 1904 novel Il fu Mattia Pascal. A separate Italian-language version of the film was also produced.

It was a popular success, and was re-released in 1942.

The film's sets were designed by Guido Fiorini.

Cast
 Pierre Blanchar as Mathias Pascal / Adrien Meis  
 Isa Miranda as Louise Paléari 
 Catherine Fonteney as La veuve Pescatore  
 Ginette Leclerc as Romilda Pescatore Pascal  
 Maximilienne as Tante Scholastique  
 Palau as Le chevalier Titus  
 Marcel Vallée as Le maire  
 Charles Granval as Octavio Meis 
 Pierre Alcover as Malagna  
 Charlotte Barbier-Krauss as Angelica Bonafede Pascal  
 Jean Hébey as Pomino  
 René Génin as L'ivrogne  
 Georges Douking as Le domestique simplet de la pension  
 Marcel Lupovici as Béraldez  
 Gaston Dupray as Le directeur du journal 
 Robert Moor as Le fossoyeur  
 Léonce Corne as L'hôtelier du Luxor  
 Henri Giquel as Le docteur Basile  
 Charles Léger as Le bibliothécaire à la retraite  
 Yvonne Yma as Adèle Meis  
 Paquita Claude as Mademoiselle Pépita  
 Enrico Glori as Le coiffeur  
 Dax Berthy as Le curé  
 Leduc as Le fournisseur de la noce  
 Margo Lion as Mademoiselle Caporale  
 Sinoël as Henri Paléari - tuteur de Louise  
 Robert Le Vigan as Le comte Papiano 
 Ornella Da Vasto
 Louis Daquin 
 Rita Livesi as Cabrini 
 Edda Soligo as Une dame à la table de jeu

References

Bibliography 
 Goble, Alan. The Complete Index to Literary Sources in Film. Walter de Gruyter, 1999.

External links 
 

1937 films
French comedy-drama films
1937 comedy-drama films
1930s French-language films
Films based on works by Luigi Pirandello
Films based on Italian novels
Films directed by Pierre Chenal
French multilingual films
Cines Studios films
Films about divorce
French black-and-white films
1937 multilingual films
1930s French films